Ňárad is a village and municipality in the Dunajská Streda District in the Trnava Region of south-west Slovakia.

History

The village was first recorded in 1468 as the estate of the Dóczy family. Until the end of World War I, it was part of Hungary and fell within the Tószigetcsilizköz district of Győr County. After the Austro-Hungarian army disintegrated in November 1918, Czechoslovak troops occupied the area. After the Treaty of Trianon of 1920, the village became officially part of Czechoslovakia. In November 1938, the First Vienna Award granted the area to Hungary and it was held by Hungary until 1945. After Soviet occupation in 1945, Czechoslovak administration returned and the village became officially part of Czechoslovakia in 1947.

The former Slovak names of the village were Topoľovec and Čiližský Ňárad.

Demography 

In 1910, the village had 659, for the most part, Hungarian inhabitants. At the 2001 Census the recorded population of the village was 616 while an end-2008 estimate by the Statistical Office had the villages's population as 623. As of 2001, 95,13 per cent of its population was Hungarian while 4,55 per cent was Slovak.

Roman Catholicism is the majority religion of the village, its adherents numbering 85.88% of the total population.

Geography
The municipality lies at an elevation of 113 metres and covers an area of 10.446 km².

References

External links
Local new at www.parameter.sk. 

Villages and municipalities in Dunajská Streda District
Hungarian communities in Slovakia